Ljubljana Stock Exchange or LJSE is a stock exchange located in Ljubljana, Slovenia. It is Slovenia's only stock exchange. The exchange trades shares of Slovenian companies, as well as bonds and commercial papers. The only stockholder of the Ljubljana Stock Exchange is Zagreb Stock Exchange.

The core business of the Ljubljana stock exchange is to ensure a secure, efficient and successful operation of the regulated segment of the Slovene capital market, in accordance with the law and other regulations.

LJSE performs the following business activities: 
 operates the stock exchange market in financial instruments, for which it had obtained authorization from the Agency,
 provides the prices of financial instruments,
 provides information on supply and demand, market values and other data on financial instruments,
 provides technical services to support trading,
 operates a CSI.

Additional activities include the services for trading members and listed companies.

History

The existing Ljubljana Stock Exchange was established in 1989. However, brokerage in Slovenia has a much longer tradition: the first stock exchange in Ljubljana existed as early as in the period between 1924 and 1942. Unfortunately, during the Second World War the trading on the old exchange was suspended, and after the war also officially banned by a decree by the new communist regime which replaced monarchy in Yugoslavia. Slovenians were thus left without a stock exchange for almost half a century. Then in the 1989 the Ljubljana Stock Exchange was officially established. In the year 1993 LJSE introduced electronic trading on BTS - on complex Stock Exchange Information System three times a week, floor trading still remained on Tuesdays and Thursdays. The new system of electronic information dissemination - SEOnet was launched in year 2002. Three years later LJSE introduced the elite segment of the official market, listing Slovenia's prime companies, and named it Prime Market. In the middle of the year 2008 the first regional road-show of SE Europe, organized by all 8 exchanges from the region, was held in Zagreb. In the same year Vienna Stock Exchange became the new majority owner of the LJSE (it acquired an 83.34% share). Year 2009 was crucial for establishment of "CEE Stock Exchange Group" (CEESEG), which at the time comprised the Vienna Stock Exchange and the stock exchanges of Budapest, Ljubljana and Prague. In the year 2010 there were a lot of important events: The SBITOP Index as the first genuine LJSE blue-chip index became a benchmark index, LJSE launched INFO HRAMBA - the new information system for the central storage of regulated information of all issuers on the LJSE, LJSE published the Slovene Capital Market Development Strategy, which had been prepared in cooperation with the capital market participants and was the answer to the changed economic and financial circumstances in the previous two years, LJSE proposed the introduction of 'P accounts' in the third pension pillar, LJSE started trading on the international trading system Xetra® and thus became integrated into the international capital market. As of July 2015 Ljubljana Stock Exchange is owned by Zagreb Stock Exchange. On 22 February 2016, the Ljubljana Stock Exchange, along with the Belgrade Stock Exchange, decided to join SEE Link, and EBRD-sponsored regional network for trading securities.

Trading

Trading on the Ljubljana Stock Exchange operates through an electronic order book in the Xetra® trading system. Xetra® trading system was implemented at the Ljubljana Stock Exchange on December 6, 2010. The Slovene capital market is now more easily accessible, internationally comparable and competitive market.
The exchange has pre-market sessions from 08:00am to 09:30am and normal trading sessions from 09:30am to 01:00pm on all days of the week except Saturdays, Sundays and holidays declared by the Exchange in advance.
On the basis of meeting the LJSE liquidity criteria, securities are traded in the continuous or auction trading methods.

The two trading methods ensure greater market integrity, improve best-price-forming mechanisms, and enable the Exchange and its members to set up internal controls and thus help identify potential cases of market manipulation.

Stock indices

SBI TOP is the first genuine LJSE blue-chip index and serves as the Slovene capital market benchmark index. It measures the performance of the most liquid and highly capitalized stocks on the LJSE Market. It is designed as a tradable index. Due to the liquidity of the constituents, it is intended to serve as underlying for index-linked financial instruments.

See also

 List of stock exchanges
 List of European stock exchanges

References

External links
 Official website of the Ljubljana Stock Exchange

Stock Exchange
Stock exchange
Business organizations based in Slovenia
Stock exchanges in Europe
1989 establishments in Slovenia
Financial services companies of Slovenia
Financial services companies established in 1989
Slovenian companies established in 1989